Elhan Kastrati (born 2 February 1997) is an Albanian professional footballer who plays as a goalkeeper for Italian club A.S. Cittadella and the Albania national team.

Club career

Early career
Kastrati started his youth career in 2009 at Teuta academies at age of 12. During the 2012–13 season he participated with the first team in 2 League & 4 Cup games. On 1 February 2014 he moved to youths of Eccellenza Abruzzo side Renato Curi Angolana.

Pescara
On 1 July 2014 Kastrati moved to Delfino Pescara 1936. He was placed at the Primavera side where he played 8 matches during the 2014–15 Campionato Nazionale Primavera. In the 2015–16 season he was part of the first team in 1 Cup and 2 2015–16 Serie B matches.

Loan to Piacenza
On 14 July 2016 he was loaned out to Lega Pro side Piacenza Calcio 1919 until the end of the season. He was a second choice behind Mirco Miori and ahead of former Roma Ivan Pelizzoli and young Stefano Dudiez. He made it his professional debut on 18 December 2016 against Prato coming on as a substitute in the 51st minute in place of striker Andrea Razzitti after that first choice Mirco Miori was sent-off.

Loan to Teuta
On 26 January 2017 Kastrati was loaned to the team where he started his career Teuta until the end of the season. On 29 June, following the end of the season, in which Kastrati collected 13 league appearances, Pescara and Teuta confirmed that Kastrati was going to remain on loan at the club for 2017–18 season.

Trapani
On 29 January 2020, he signed with Serie B club Trapani.

International career

Albania U17
Kastrati received his first Albania under-17 call-up by manager Džemal Mustedanagić for a friendly tournament developed in August 2012 in Romania.

Albania U19
On 3 November 2015, Kastrati received a call-up by Albania under-19 squad coach Arjan Bellaj to participate in 2016 UEFA European Under-19 Championship qualifiers from 12–17 November 2015.

He made his debut in the opening match against Austria which finished in a 2–1 loss, and also played in the final match against Wales which ended in victory. He was an unused substitute against Georgia as coach Bellaj placed Gentian Selmani instead.

Albania U21
Kastrati was called up at under-21 side by coach Redi Jupi for the double friendly matches against Czech Republic on 20 & 23 May 2016.

Later in 2017, Kastrati received another call-up this time by the new coach Alban Bushi in two occasions in January for a gathering in Durrës, and for a double friendly match against Moldova in March.

In June 2017, Kastrati was called up for the friendly against France on 5 June 2017 and the opening 2019 UEFA European Under-21 Championship qualifying match against Estonia one week later.

Albania
He debuted with the senior Albania national team in a friendly 0–0 tie with Estonia on 13 June 2022.

Career statistics

Club

References

External links

Elhan Kastrati profile FSHF.org

1997 births
Living people
People from Has (municipality)
Albanian footballers
Albania international footballers
Albania youth international footballers
Albania under-21 international footballers
Association football goalkeepers
KF Teuta Durrës players
Delfino Pescara 1936 players
Piacenza Calcio 1919 players
Trapani Calcio players
A.S. Cittadella players
Kategoria Superiore players
Serie B players
Serie C players
Albanian expatriate footballers
Albanian expatriate sportspeople in Italy
Expatriate footballers in Italy